E312 may refer to:
 Dodecyl gallate, an antioxidant
 European route E312, a European B class road in the Netherlands, connecting the cities of Flushing (Vlissingen) and Eindhoven